George Lewis Ruffin (December 16, 1834 – November 19, 1886) was a barber, attorney, politician and judge.  In 1869 he graduated from Harvard Law School, the first African American to do so. He was also the first African American elected to the Boston City Council. Ruffin was elected in 1870 to the Massachusetts Legislature. In 1883, he was appointed by the governor Benjamin Franklin Butler as a judge to the Municipal Court, Charlestown district in Boston, making him the first African American judge in the United States. He married 16 year-old  Josephine St. Pierre in 1858. Florida Ruffin Ridley was one of their children.

Biography
Ruffin was born to George W. (1800–1863) and Nancy Lewis Ruffin (1816–1874) in Richmond, Virginia as a free person of color, of African and European ancestry. The city had a large free black community. His family moved to Boston in 1853, where he was educated in the public schools.

Marriage and family
In 1858, he married Josephine St. Pierre, who was of Afro-Caribbean, French and English descent.  Together they had four sons and a daughter.  Their children were Hubert, who became an attorney; Florida Ridley, a school principal and co-founder with her mother of the newspaper The Woman's Era; Stanley, an inventor; George, a musician; and Robert, who died in his first year of life.

Career
Ruffin became a barber to support his family and read law books on the side and studied law with the partnership of Harvey Jewell and William Gaston He started publishing articles in a law journal and was admitted to Harvard Law School. and saved enough money to enroll.  After graduating in 1869, the first African American to earn a law degree Harvard University, he practiced with success in Boston. He was politically active and attended the National Negro Convention of 1864 in Syracuse, New York and of 1872 in New Orleans.

He was elected to the state legislature in 1870 as a Republican and served one term. Ruffin was elected as the first man of African descent to the Boston City Council, where he served two terms, 1875–1876 and 1876–1877.

He supported Benjamin F. Butler in Butler's 1871 campaign for governor, and November 7, 1883, he was appointed by then Governor Butler as a judge of the Municipal Court, Charlestown district.  He was the first African American justice to hold office in New England. That year he was also made consul resident for the Dominican Republic. At the time the Dominican President was Ulises Heureaux who was also of mostly West African descent.

He died in Boston, Massachusetts and is buried in Mount Auburn Cemetery.

Introduces book by Douglass
In 1881 Ruffin provided the introduction to The Life and Times of Frederick Douglass, written by himself, for its first edition by Park Publishing Co., Hartford. Therein he situated the book in its historical context, described its author, and quickly sketched the major events of his momentous life. From his personal witness, Ruffin narrated a scene of the courage and resolve shown by Douglass in the face of an angry mob, at Tremont Temple in 1860.

Legacy and honors
1984, the George Lewis Ruffin Society was founded in his honor at Northeastern University to support minorities studying in the Massachusetts criminal justice system.

See also
Macon Bolling Allen is believed to be both the first black man licensed to practice law and to hold a judicial position in the United States.
Jane Bolin was both the first black woman to graduate from Yale Law School and serve as a judge in the United States.
Thurgood Marshall was the first black Associate Justice of the U.S. Supreme Court.
Charlotte E. Ray was the first black woman lawyer in the United States.
List of African-American jurists
List of first minority male lawyers and judges in Massachusetts

External links

References

1834 births
1886 deaths
Harvard Law School alumni
African-American lawyers
African-American judges
Massachusetts lawyers
Lawyers from Richmond, Virginia
Boston City Council members
Republican Party members of the Massachusetts House of Representatives
Lawyers from Boston
19th century in Boston
Burials at Mount Auburn Cemetery
19th-century American politicians
People from the West End, Boston
19th-century American judges
19th-century American lawyers